Bernárd J. Lynch (born 1947) is an Irish Catholic priest and psychotherapist based in London, renowned for his human rights work with HIV/AIDS and with the LGBTQIA community. He studied theology and philosophy with the Society of African Missions in Dromantine, near Newry and was ordained in 1971.

Lynch is an out gay man and married his husband in 2017.

Career
Lynch has worked for the rights of LGBT people for more than forty years starting with his work in Dignity USA (New York Chapter), the LGBT Catholic group, after his ordination in 1971.

In 1982, Lynch founded the first AIDS ministry in New York City with Dignity USA (New York Chapter) as documented in the documentary films AIDS: A PRIEST’S TESTAMENT in 1987 and SOUL SURVIVOR in 1990. Lynch publicly campaigned in support of Mayor Ed Koch's Executive Order 50 in 1984, which compels City contractors not to discriminate on the basis of sexual orientation.

Lynch publicly testified in favour of New York City’s lesbian and gay rights bill that bans discrimination based on sexual orientation in jobs and public accommodations, seeing it through to passage by the New York City Council in 1986.

As reported in the documentary film A PRIEST ON TRIAL, Lynch's support for LGBT rights brought down on him a false prosecution perpetrated by church and government officials. In 1988, Lynch was indicted for child sex abuse alleged to have occurred at Mount Saint Michael Academy in The Bronx in the mid 1980s. Lynch won total exoneration from Justice Burton Roberts in Bronx Supreme Court. He later moved to London and started a ministry for gay priests.

Lynch faced a civil lawsuit, filed in 2019, in New York related to the abuse allegations for which he was acquitted in criminal court in 1989. It was claimed in 2021 that he was again cleared of all charges.

Personal life 
In 2006, Lynch became the first Catholic priest in the world to have a civil partnership after having this relationship publicly blessed in 1998. In the early 2010s, he was reportedly expelled from the Society of African Missions and the priesthood. He legally married his partner, Billy Desmond, in 2017 in Ireland.

Honors 
Lynch was honoured with the Magnus Hirschfeld Award 1988 for outstanding service to the cause of Irish LGBT civil rights. In 2017, Lynch received a proclamation from the New York City Council honouring his more than 40 years of service to the LGBT and AIDS communities in the city. Lynch received Presidential Distinguished Service Awards for the Irish Abroad for 2019, in the Charitable Works category. The awards recognise the contribution of members of the Irish diaspora in the world.

Publications
Lynch, Bernard (1993). A Priest on Trial. London: Bloomsbury Pub Ltd. 
Lynch, Bernard (1995). "A Land Beyond Tears". In O'Carroll, Ide; Collins, Eoin (ed.). Lesbian and Gay Visions of Ireland: Towards the Twenty-first Century. London: Cassell. pp. 212–20. 
Lynch, Bernard (1996). "Religious and Spirituality Conflicts". In Davies, Dominic; Neal, Charles (ed.). Pink Therapy: A Guide for Counsellors and Therapists Working with Lesbian, Gay and Bisexual Clients. Buckingham: Open University Press. pp. 199–207. 
Lynch, Bernard (2003). "Love's Endeavour, Love Expense". In O'Brien, Glen (ed.). Coming Out: Irish Gay Experiences. Dublin: Currach Press. pp. 260–68. 
Lynch, Bernard (2012). If It Wasn't Love, Sex Death & God. Winchester: Circle Books. 
Lynch, Bernard (2022). "An Appreciation of the Life of my Dear Friend, Michael Kelly". In Brown, Andrew (ed.). Into Your Hands: Essays Inspired by Mystic, Prophet, and Activist Michael Bernard Kelly. Melbourne: Clouds of Magellan Press. pp. 125–128.

Legacy
 AIDS: A Priest's Testament (1987, Director: Conor McAnally, A Strongbow/ Green Apple Production for Channel Four, UK)
 A Priest On Trial (1990, Director: Conor McAnally, A Green Apple Television Production for Channel Four, UK)
 Soul Survivor (1990, Director: Conor McAnally, A Green Apple Television Production for Channel Four, UK)

References

1947 births
Living people
Irish LGBT people
LGBT Roman Catholic priests
Irish LGBT rights activists
Irish expatriates in the United States
Date of birth missing (living people)
People from Ennis
21st-century LGBT people
Society of African Missions